Robyn Love (born 28 August 1990) is a 3.5 point British wheelchair basketball player who represented Great Britain at the 2016 Paralympic Games.

Biography
Robyn Love was born in Ayr, Scotland, on 28 August 1990. She was born with arthrogryposis, a rare condition in which the muscles are shortened, due to the wrapping of the umbilical cord around her legs. As a result, her right leg is shorter than her left, and she is missing muscles in both legs. At school she played football and tennis, but refused to participate in athletics because she knew her disability prevented her from running as fast as the other kids. During her 2008 gap year before university, surgeons at Glasgow Royal Infirmary attempted to lengthen her leg by breaking it and using plaster and pins to keep it straight. The pins had to be tightened daily, which was excruciatingly painful. They also inserted a plate in her femur that helped her walk better, but her right leg remained  shorter, and she still walked with a limp. In 2009, she entered Edinburgh Napier University, where she studied biomedical sciences. One of the first things she did was find sports organisations, and she started playing basketball.

By embracing her disability, Love was set on the path to becoming an elite athlete. A friend suggested she try wheelchair basketball. Love attended a "come and try" day run by the Lothian Phoenix club in November 2013, and met Tina Gordon from Sportscotland, who became her coach. Love was classified a 3.5-point player, and Gordon trained her, and even bought her a £1,000 wheelchair basketball sports chair. Love played her first wheelchair basketball game in January 2014, shooting 16 points in a winning game. She went on to win the Scottish Cup with Lothian Phoenix and the Scottish Universities Cup with Edinburgh Napier University. In October 2014, she attended a national team training camp, and in 2015 she relocated to the University of Worcester, where the national team is based. She made her international debut with the national team at the Osaka Cup in Japan in February 2015, winning silver. This was followed by bronze at the European Championships in September 2015, securing a place for the British team at the 2016 Paralympic Games in Rio de Janeiro. In May 2016, she was selected as part of the side for Rio. The British team produced its best ever performance at the Paralympics, making it all the way to the semi-finals, but lost to the semi-final to the United States, and then the bronze medal match to the Netherlands.

Achievements
 2015: Bronze at the European Championships (Worcester, England)
 2016: Fourth at the 2016 Paralympics (Rio de Janeiro, Brazil)
 2017: Bronze at the European Championships (Tenerife, Spain)
 2018: Silver at the 2018 Wheelchair Basketball World Championship (Hamburg, Germany)

Personal life
She is engaged to fellow wheelchair basketball player Laurie Williams.

References

External links
 
 

1990 births
Living people
British women's wheelchair basketball players
Paralympic wheelchair basketball players of Great Britain
Wheelchair basketball players at the 2016 Summer Paralympics
Wheelchair basketball players at the 2020 Summer Paralympics
Sportspeople from Ayr
Scottish LGBT sportspeople